The 2011 Morocco Tennis Tour – Rabat was a professional tennis tournament played on clay courts. It was the fifth edition of the tournament which is part of the 2011 ATP Challenger Tour. It took place in Rabat, Morocco between 14 and 20 March 2011.

ATP entrants

Seeds

 Rankings are as of March 7, 2011.

Other entrants
The following players received wildcards into the singles main draw:
  Yassine Idmbarek
  Malek Jaziri
  Hicham Khaddari
  Younes Rachidi

The following players received entry from the qualifying draw:
  Christian Lindell
  Maxime Teixeira
  Jonathan Dasnières de Veigy
  Pablo Carreño Busta

Champions

Singles

 Ivo Minář def.  Peter Luczak, 7–5, 6–3

Doubles

 Alessio di Mauro /  Simone Vagnozzi def.  Evgeny Korolev /  Yuri Schukin, 6–4, 6–4

External links
Official Website
ITF Search 
ATP official site

Rabat
2011
21st century in Rabat